

Orders, decorations, and medals

Orders, decorations, and medals (Federal Territory of Malaysia) 

See also Federal Territory Day

Precedence:

See also 

 List of post-nominal letters (Malaysia) by alphabetical order
 List of honorary Malay title holders
 Malay styles and titles
 Orders, decorations, and medals of Malaysia
 Malaysian order of precedence

Post-nominal letters of Sultanates :

 List of post-nominal letters (Johor)
 List of post-nominal letters (Kedah)
 List of post-nominal letters (Kelantan)
 List of post-nominal letters (Negeri Sembilan)
 List of post-nominal letters (Pahang)
 List of post-nominal letters (Perak)
 List of post-nominal letters (Perlis)
 List of post-nominal letters (Selangor)
 List of post-nominal letters (Terengganu)

Post-nominal letters of non-royal States :

 List of post-nominal letters (Malacca)
 List of post-nominal letters (Penang)
 List of post-nominal letters (Sabah)
 List of post-nominal letters (Sarawak)

References 

 01
Post-nominal letters
Malaysia